Glenn Warfe (born 19 January 1984) is an Australian badminton player. He competed for Australia at the 2008 and 2012 Summer Olympics.

Achievements

Oceania Championships
Men's doubles

Mixed doubles

BWF International Challenge/Series
Men's doubles

Mixed doubles

  BWF International Challenge tournament
  BWF International Series tournament
  BWF Future Series tournament

References

External links
 

1984 births
Living people
Sportsmen from Victoria (Australia)
Australian male badminton players
Olympic badminton players of Australia
Badminton players at the 2008 Summer Olympics
Badminton players at the 2012 Summer Olympics
Commonwealth Games competitors for Australia
Badminton players at the 2014 Commonwealth Games
Badminton players at the 2010 Commonwealth Games
Sportspeople from Melbourne
People from Werribee, Victoria